Anthony Peter Moore (4 September 1947 – 7 July 2017) was a footballer who played as a winger in the Football League for Chesterfield, Grimsby Town and Chester.

References

1947 births
2017 deaths
Sportspeople from Scarborough, North Yorkshire
Association football wingers
English footballers
Chesterfield F.C. players
Grimsby Town F.C. players
Chester City F.C. players
Corby Town F.C. players
English Football League players
Footballers from North Yorkshire